Swimming at the 1975 South Pacific Games took place in Agana, the capital of Guam on 2–9 August 1975. It was the fifth edition of the South Pacific Games. Four new events were included in 1975 (4 x 200 metre Freestyle relay and 100m Breaststroke added to both the men's and women's programs). Of the other events previously contested, only one remained without a new South Pacific Games record at the end of the competition after sixteen records were broken in Guam. The teams from the French-administered territories of French Polynesia (Tahiti) and New Caledonia won the most gold medals. The most successful individual swimmer, however, was Papua New Guinea's Charlie Martin who won eight medals, four of which were gold.

Medal summary

Medal table

Men
French Polynesia (Tahiti) and Papua New Guinea won 7 and 5 gold medals respectively in the 12 men's events.

Women
New Caledonia dominated the women's events, winning 8 of the 9 gold medals available.

Notes
NE denotes new event to the South Pacific Games.

GR denotes South Pacific Games record time.

Participating countries
Teams entered in the swimming competition included:

References

1975 Pacific Games
Pacific Games
Swimming at the Pacific Games